Cadette is a village in the Chambellan commune in the Jérémie Arrondissement, in the Grand'Anse department of Haiti.

Populated places in Grand'Anse (department)